The 2011 Surrey Heath Borough Council election took place on 5 May 2011 to elect all members of Surrey Heath Borough Council the Conservatives won 35 of the 40 seats giving them a majority of 30.

Result 

|}

Ward results

Bagshot

Bisley

Chobham

Frimley

Frimley Green

Heatherside

Lightwater

Mytchett and Deepcut

Old Dean

Parkside

St Michael's

St Paul's

Town

Watchetts

West End

Windlesham

References

2011
2011 English local elections
2010s in Surrey